Events from the year 1737 in Canada.

Incumbents
French Monarch: Louis XV
British and Irish Monarch: George II

Governors
Governor General of New France: Charles de la Boische, Marquis de Beauharnois
Colonial Governor of Louisiana: Jean-Baptiste le Moyne de Bienville
Governor of Nova Scotia: Lawrence Armstrong
Commodore-Governor of Newfoundland: Jean-Baptiste Le Moyne de Bienville

Events
 Marguerite d'Youville (Born Varennes, France October 15, 1701 Died December 28, 1771) and some friends in Montreal, begin taking in the poor and educating abandoned children.

Births

Full date unknown
 Matonabbee, leading Indian (d.1782)

Deaths
 29 September - Joseph Adams, chief factor of the Hudson's Bay Company. (b. 1700)

Historical documents
Ways French try to surpass British include linking Canada and Louisiana through wheat- and lead-rich Great Lakes province called "Hanois(e)"

Intendant says Canadians "have a too-high opinion of Themselves [to achieve] the success they are capable of in the arts, Agriculture and Commerce"

French priest gets tough with shipwreck victims, calling their despair criminal in eyes of God, to whom they should offer their pain

Shipwrecked priest learns respect for Indigenous people "whom a false prejudice makes us suppose incapable of thinking or reasoning"

Ship carrying sugar from Jamaica to London loses 17 drowned plus one of three who made it to shore after it wrecks on Sable Island

Minas Indigenous people are accused of forcing sloop captain and crew to give up trade cargo worth £1,546 New England currency

Pre-teen servant confesses to intentionally burning his master's house, and Council delays judgment pending legal advice from Boston

Board of Trade submits proposal for settlement of Nova Scotia under trustee-appointed council until assembly and government can be established

Unemployed London carpenters and other artisans request free passage to and 200-acre grants in 14-miles-square township in Nova Scotia

King's rent collector must: take in quit-rents, fines and arrearages; note all sales, exchanges and wills; and "take a Particular Account" of strangers

In Nova Scotia, "all discoverers of mines or minerals [will have] an equal share with those who own and work them"

Noting his seizure of smugglers' ship in Newfoundland, Navy captain hopes new admiralty court there will end such long-practised trade

Mission society has missionaries at Trinity Bay, Newf. and Albany, N.Y. ("to the Mohawk-Indians") and schoolmasters at Annapolis Royal and Canso

Trinity Bay can't support its missionary after "catching little Fish for two or three Voyages, and selling at a bad Market"

Massachusetts governor gives brief details of military assets in Canada, and warns of danger to trade and Indigenous relations

Gov. Belcher reports good results from talks and local contacts with Penobscot, citing benefit of "honestly and justly" observing treaties

New York lieutenant governor will meet Six Nations to renew treaties and "keep them from" allowing French fort in Seneca country

N.Y. lieutenant governor reports complaint from Gov. Beauharnois and query to Oswego officer about shooting at French canoe passing by

Arthur Dobbs calls Hudson's Bay Company's 1736 bid to find Northwest Passage "idle or faulty," and company "unwilling to make the Attempt"

References 

 
1730s in Canada
Canada
37